The 2015 Winchester City Council election took place on 7 May 2015 to elect members of Winchester City Council in England. In total, 20 out of 57 council seats were up for election. The Conservatives gained majority control of Winchester City Council from No Overall Control, following the defection of two former Conservative councillors to the Liberal Democrats in 2014.

After the election, the composition of Winchester City Council was:
Conservative 33
Liberal Democrat 22
Labour 2

Election results

Ward Results

References

2015 English local elections
May 2015 events in the United Kingdom
2015
2010s in Hampshire